Inositol 1,4,5-trisphosphate receptor, type 3, also known as ITPR3, is a protein which in humans is encoded by the ITPR3 gene. The protein encoded by this gene is both a receptor for inositol triphosphate and a calcium channel.

Function 

ITP3 channels serve an important role in the taste transduction pathway of sweet, bitter and umami tastes the gustatory system. ITP3 channels allow the flow of Calcium out of the endoplasmic reticulum in response to IP3. Calcium cations result in the activation of TRPM5 which leads to a depolarisation generating potential and an action potential.

See also
 Inositol trisphosphate receptor

References

Further reading

External links
 

Ion channels